David D'Auria, a Welsh football midfielder
 Francesco D'Auria, an Italian conductor, composer, and music educator
 Girolamo D'Auria, Italian sculptor
 Gregory D’Auria, an American lawyer and judge
 Joey D'Auria, an American actor and a voice actor
 Tippy D'Auria, the founder of the Winter Star Party 
 De Auria, Italian family

See also 

 Auria (disambiguation)